Seven Springs was a restaurant chain based in South Korea owned by the Samyang Group. 

In 2014, the chain had over 25 retail stores in South Korea. However, by 2019, only four locations remained, and Samyang Group reported an operating loss of  that year. On April 17, 2020, Samyang Group announced that they would withdraw from the restaurant business, closing all remaining Seven Springs locations by the end of that month.

References

External links
 

South Korean brands
Restaurant chains in South Korea